Reed Ranch Airport  is a public use airport located 12 nautical miles (14 mi, 22 km) southwest of the central business district of Yellow Pine, in Valley County, Idaho, United States. It is owned by the Idaho Division of Aeronautics / USFS.

Facilities 
Reed Ranch Airport resides at elevation of 4,157 feet (1,267 m) above mean sea level. It has one runway designated 16/34 with a dirt surface measuring 2,175 by 100 feet (663 x 30 m).

See also 
 Johnson Creek Airport (FAA: 3U2), located 3 nautical miles (6 km) south of Yellow Pine, at

References

External links 
 Topographic map showing Reed Ranch Landing Strip from USGS The National Map

 

Airports in Idaho
Transportation in Valley County, Idaho